Urbandale is a city in Polk and Dallas counties, Iowa, United States. As of the 2020 U.S. Census, the city population was 45,580. It is part of the Des Moines–West Des Moines Metropolitan Statistical Area.

History
Urbandale was incorporated as a city on April 16, 1917. In its early days, Urbandale served as a streetcar suburb of Des Moines with four coal mines. Urbandale served as the end of the "Urbandale Line" after plans to build a railroad from Des Moines to Woodward were abandoned because of right-of-way issues. The coal mines had closed by the end of the 1940s while streetcar service ended in 1951.

In 1920, shortly after the city incorporated, Urbandale had 298 people. Its population in 1950 was 1,777, but the city grew rapidly after that along with the rest of Des Moines' suburbs. By 1970, Urbandale had 14,434 people, and in 2000 it had 29,072. Although most of the city's developed area is in Polk County, Urbandale has expanded westward into Dallas County in recent years.

In 2012, Urbandale gained national attention after President Barack Obama held a reelection campaign rally at Living History Farms.

Geography
Urbandale is located in the northwest part of the Des Moines Metro Area at the intersections of Interstates 35 and 80, and Iowa Highway 141.

Demographics
The median income for a household in the city was $59,744, and the median income for a family was $70,548 (these figures had risen to $69,269 and $86,885 respectively as of a 2007 estimate). Males had a median income of $45,470 versus $32,631 for females. The per capita income for the city was $29,021. About 2.5% of families and 3.7% of the population were below the poverty line, including 4.7% of those under age 18 and 4.3% of those age 65 or over.

2010 U.S. Census

As of the 2010 United States Census there were 39,463 people, 15,596 households, and 10,815 families living in the city. The racial makeup of the city was 91.1% White, 2.8% African American, 0.1% Native American, 3.5% Asian, 0.8% from other races, and 1.7% from two or more races. Hispanic or Latino of any race were 3.1% of the population.

There were 15,596 households, of which 35.4% had children under the age of 18 living with them, 59.2% were married couples living together, 7.2% had a female householder with no husband present, 2.9% had a male householder with no wife present, and 30.7% were non-families. 25.0% of all households were made up of individuals, and 8.8% had someone living alone who was 65 years of age or older. The average household size was 2.52 and the average family size was 3.04.

The median age in the city was 37.8 years. 26.1% of residents were under the age of 18; 6.2% were between the ages of 18 and 24; 28.9% were from 25 to 44; 27% were from 45 to 64; and 11.8% were 65 years of age or older. The gender makeup of the city was 48.4% male and 51.6% female.

2000 U.S. Census
As of the 2000 United States Census there were 29,072 people, 11,484 households, and 8,038 families living in the city. The racial makeup of the city was 95.18% White, 1.53% African American, 0.09% Native American, 1.73% Asian, 0.10% Pacific Islander, 0.51% from other races, and 0.86% from two or more races. Hispanic or Latino of any race were 1.60% of the population.

There were 11,484 households, out of which 35.0% had children under the age of 18 living with them, 60.7% were married couples living together, 7.1% had a female householder with no husband present, and 30.0% were non-families. 24.2% of all households were made up of individuals, and 7.2% had someone living alone who was 65 years of age or older. The average household size was 2.51 and the average family size was 3.02.

Age spread: 26.3% under the age of 18, 7.0% from 18 to 24, 31.3% from 25 to 44, 24.6% from 45 to 64, and 10.8% who were 65 years of age or older. The median age was 37 years. For every 100 females, there were 93.4 males. For every 100 females age 18 and over, there were 89.0 males.

Economy
While Urbandale is primarily a residential city, other development has increased in recent years, particularly in the business parks located inside the Urban Loop. This 12-mile stretch of I-35/I-80 has multiple access points to Urbandale. Businesses in the Urban Loop have high freeway visibility and traffic counts which continue to fuel the rapid growth of this area.

The Multi-State Lottery Association (MUSL), which oversees operations for its multi-state games is located in Urbandale, although Powerball is now drawn in Florida.

Top employers
According to Urbandale's 2017 Comprehensive Annual Financial Report, the top employers in the city are:

Urban Loop
The Urban Loop is a development area in the north/central portion of Urbandale and is recognized for the easily accessible network of traffic routes; including interstate access, highway access, and local road access.

Unofficially, the name Rider Corner was used locally to define the ninety-degree bend in the 35/80 interstate system that runs through Urbandale. The proposed area was officially named in the fall of 2017 and has been used by the Urbandale City Government, developers, and real estate brokers to describe the area. Some local media outlets have not discontinued use of the name Rider Corner.

Parks and recreation

Urbandale is the home of Living History Farms, where Pope John Paul II spoke to a crowd estimated at 350,000 on October 4, 1979, and the Buccaneer Arena, home to the Des Moines Buccaneers hockey team.

Government
Urbandale uses the council-manager form of government. The city council consists of the mayor and five council members, all of which are elected to four-year terms.

Education
Multiple public school districts serve portions of Urbandale: Urbandale Community School District, Dallas Center–Grimes Community School District, Des Moines School District, Johnston School District, Waukee School District and West Des Moines School District.

The Urbandale Community School District consists of six elementary schools, one middle school, and one high school (Urbandale High School).

Des Moines Christian School is in Urbandale.

St. Pius X Catholic School of the Roman Catholic Diocese of Des Moines is in Urbandale. It opened with an initial 120 students in September 1956. Initially its facility was one story tall and had eight classrooms, but an additional eight classrooms were added after construction began on another section on May 1, 1962. That section had two stories. The area Catholic high school is Dowling Catholic High School in West Des Moines.

Notable people

Chuck Horner, retired United States Air Force four-star general, raised in Urbandale and graduated from Urbandale High School in 1954, commanded the airpower portion of the Gulf War.
Eddie Berlin, former NFL wide receiver, graduated from Urbandale High School in 1996.
Scott Clemmensen, former NHL goaltender
Tom Hess, 2011 USBC Masters champion, hometown
Paul Gray, former bassist for the metal band Slipknot
Allen Lazard, an NFL wide receiver for the New York Jets. Graduated from Urbandale High School in 2014. Attended Iowa State University
Sean Runyan, former Major League Baseball player, graduated from Urbandale High School in 1992.
Paul J. Springer, current professor at the Air Command and Staff College, author of more than a dozen books, graduated from Urbandale High School in 1993.

References

External links

 
Official City Website
Chamber of Commerce

 
Cities in Iowa
Cities in Polk County, Iowa
Cities in Dallas County, Iowa
Populated places established in 1917
Des Moines metropolitan area
1917 establishments in Iowa